In mathematics, solid partitions are natural generalizations of partitions and plane partitions defined by Percy Alexander MacMahon.
 
and
 for all 
As the definition of solid partitions involves three-dimensional arrays of numbers, they are also called three-dimensional partitions in notation where plane partitions are two-dimensional partitions and partitions are one-dimensional partitions. Solid partitions and their higher-dimensional generalizations are discussed in the book by Andrews.

Ferrers diagrams for solid partitions 

Another representation for solid partitions is in the form of Ferrers diagrams.

For instance, the Ferrers diagram

There is a natural action of the permutation group  on a Ferrers diagram – this corresponds to permuting the four coordinates of all nodes. This generalises the operation denoted by  conjugation on usual partitions.

Equivalence of the two representations 

Given a Ferrers diagram, one constructs the solid partition (as in the main definition) as follows.
Let  be the number of nodes in the Ferrers diagram with coordinates of the form  where  denotes an arbitrary value. The collection  form a solid partition. One can verify that condition FD implies that the conditions for a solid partition are satisfied.

Given a set of  that form a solid partition, one obtains the corresponding Ferrers diagram as follows.
Start with the Ferrers diagram with no nodes. By construction, it is easy to see that condition FD is satisfied.

For example, the Ferrers diagram with  nodes  given above corresponds to the solid partition with 
 
with all other  vanishing.

Generating function 

Let . Define the generating function of solid partitions, by

The generating functions of integer partitions and plane partitions have simple product formulae, due to Euler and MacMahon, respectively. However, a guess of MacMahon fails to correctly reproduce the solid partitions of 6. It appears that there is no simple formula for the generating function of solid partitions; in particular, there cannot be any formula analogous to the product formulas of Euler and MacMahon.

Exact enumeration using computers 

Given the lack of an explicitly known generating function, the enumerations of the numbers of solid partitions for larger integers have been carried out numerically. There are two algorithms that are used to enumerate solid partitions and their higher-dimensional generalizations. The work of Atkin. et al. used an algorithm due to Bratley and McKay. In 1970, Knuth proposed a different algorithm to enumerate topological sequences that he used to evaluate numbers of solid partitions of all integers . Mustonen and Rajesh extended the enumeration for all integers . In 2010, S. Balakrishnan proposed a parallel version of Knuth's algorithm that has been used to extend the enumeration to all integers . One finds 

which is a 19 digit number illustrating the difficulty in carrying out such exact enumerations.

Asymptotic behavior 

It is conjectured that there exists a constant  such that

References

External links 
 
 The Solid Partitions Project of IIT Madras
 The Mathworld entry for Solid Partitions

Enumerative combinatorics
Integer partitions